Jiamin line is a commuter rail line currently under construction on the Shanghai Suburban Railway, and will be run by China Railway. Construction started on 28 June 2021. The line is expected to open in 2027.

Proposed Stations

Important stations
Except for the Hongqiao hub section, which is laid on the ground, the length of the ground section is 2.68 kilometers, and the rest are all underground sections, the length of which is 41.36 kilometers. There are 14 underground stations and 1 ground station on the whole line. It adopts EMU trains with a maximum operating speed of 160 km/h, and a combined fast and slow train transportation mode.

The line has double island platforms in some stations, allowing express/local services.

Future extensions
 The line is expected to be extended north to Taicang in neighboring Jiangsu Province in the future.

References

Notes

Shanghai Metro lines
Proposed buildings and structures in Shanghai
Shanghai